Michael O'Shea (born 16 September 1954) is an Irish long-distance runner. He competed in the men's 5000 metres at the 1980 Summer Olympics.

References

External links
 

1954 births
Living people
Athletes (track and field) at the 1980 Summer Olympics
Irish male long-distance runners
Olympic athletes of Ireland
Place of birth missing (living people)